Martin Zikl (born 13 June 1999) is a Czech footballer who currently plays as a forward for FC Zbrojovka Brno.

Club career

FC Zbrojovka Brno
He made his professional debut for Zbrojovka Brno in the home match against Teplice on 18 November 2017, which ended in a win 1–0. Zikl scored his first Zbrojovka goal in the home game against Zlín on 2 December 2017 that ended in a draw 1–1.

References

External links
 Profile at FC Zbrojovka Brno official site
 Profile at fotbal.idnes.cz
 Profile at FAČR official site

1999 births
Living people
Czech footballers
Czech Republic youth international footballers
Association football forwards
Czech First League players
FC Zbrojovka Brno players
SK Líšeň players
Footballers from Brno
Czech National Football League players